The Chiquitta is an olive cultivar from Spain. It is a hybrid of Picual (female) and Arbequina (male) olives.

References 

Olive cultivars